Kasmala is a rural locality (a selo) in Chernopyatovsky Selsoviet, Pavlovsky District, Altai Krai, Russia. The population was 52 as of 2013. There are 3 streets.

Geography 
Nagorny is the nearest rural locality.

References 

Rural localities in Pavlovsky District, Altai Krai